Muria Strait was a strait that once existed and connected Java and Muria Island. This strait was once a bustling trading area, with trading cities such as Demak, Jepara, Pati, and Juwana. In around 1657, river deposits that emptied into this strait were carried to the sea so that the strait was getting shallower and disappeared, so that Muria Island merged with Java Island.

Geography 
The Muria Strait is currently included in the main non-structural plain, which means that it is estimated that in a period in the past the area was an ocean.

Muria Island 
At the time of the Muria Strait there was an island called Muria Island. The landscape of Muria Island itself consists of Mount Muria which is located in the middle. While in the southern part there are Patiayam hills which were formed from the volcanic activity of Mount Muria in the past (some examples are Maar Bambang, Maar Gunungrowo, and Maar Gembong).

Paleontological records state that the Patiayam hills area has various fossils of ancient buffalo (Bos bubalis paleokarbau), banteng (Bos bibos paleosondaicus, deer family/Cervidae (Cervus zwaani), wild boar family, elephant, stegodon elephant, hippopotamus family, tiger family, turtle family, and mollusk fossils.

On this island are also located the capital cities of the northern coast of Java, such as Jepara, Kudus, and Pati.

Harbor 
In its time on the banks of the Muria Strait there were trading ports with various commodities such as traditional cloth from Jepara, salt and shrimp paste from Juwana, and rice from the interior of Java and Muria Island. In addition, the existence of the strait also makes the Muria Strait area the location of shipyards that produce Javanese junks made of teak wood which are commonly found in the Kendeng Mountains, which is located in the south of the strait. The existence of a shipbuilding industry made this area richer than the center of the Majapahit Kingdom, so this area which was dominated by Muslim merchants who were nicknamed by Tomé Pires (a Portuguese writer) as "lords of the junks".

Initially, this area consisted of small ports around the strait with Demak as the main port, but due to political conflicts, commodities originating from the area around the Muria Strait (Muria Island and Kendeng Mountains) shifted to Sunda Kelapa Harbor. In addition, a report in 1657 stated that fluvial deposits from rivers that emptied into the Muria Strait such as Serang River, Tuntang River, and Lusi River resulted in siltation so that the strait could not be crossed by large ships. The trading center was moved to Jepara. Because of this siltation, Tumenggung Natairnawa from Pati had ordered to dig up the sediment in the strait, but the sediment was getting faster in removing the Muria Strait. In the last days of the existence of the Muria Strait there was a water channel that could be passed by small boats which is now called Kalilondo.

Current condition 
The remainder of the Muria Strait can be seen by a river called Kalilondo which stretches from Juwana in the east to Ketanjung in the west. Several rivers are also formed from the former Muria Strait such as the Silugunggo River which crosses the Pati Regency area. In this area, there are often the discovery of the wreckage of boats, ships, and cannons which are evidence of the existence of a strait in this area.

In addition, the area that used to be the Muria Strait is often flooded during the rainy season.

References 

Straits of Indonesia
Waterways